John Eric Smith (29 July 1934 – 12 June 1991) was a Scottish professional footballer, who played as a right half for Celtic, Leeds United and Greenock Morton in the 1950s and 1960s. He was capped twice for the Scotland national football team and later managed Morton, Hamilton Academical and Sharjah FC.

Playing career
Smith began his professional career at Celtic in the 1954–55 season and gained two caps for the Scotland national football team in 1959. He did not win any major honours during his spell, finishing on the losing side in the 1956 Scottish Cup Final - Celtic won two Scottish League Cups in the period, but Smith was not selected for either final.

He joined Leeds United in 1960 when the club was in decline, and performed heroically during the 1961–62 season when Leeds battled against relegation to the Third Division. Smith's career at Elland Road ended when he suffered a double-fracture of the leg during a home game against Chelsea in September 1962. He joined Morton in 1964 where he played for two seasons and later became manager.

Managerial career
Smith managed Morton briefly in 1972 and then managed Hamilton Academical for five seasons from 1972–73 to 1977–78. He then briefly managed Sharjah FC in the United Arab Emirates in 1978. He then managed Cypriot club Pezoporikos Larnaca from 1986 to 1989. The club won the 1987–88 Cypriot First Division and then entered the 1988–89 European Cup, where they were beaten in the first round by Swedish champions IFK Gothenburg.

Honours 
Celtic
Scottish Cup: Runners-up 1955–56
Glasgow Charity Cup: 1958–59

Morton
Renfrewshire Cup: 1965–66

Pezoporikos Larnaca 
Cypriot First Division 1987–88

Career statistics

Leeds United

References

External links 

1934 births
1991 deaths
Footballers from Glasgow
Scottish footballers
Association football wing halves
Celtic F.C. players
Leeds United F.C. players
Greenock Morton F.C. players
Scotland international footballers
Scottish Football League players
English Football League players
Scottish expatriate football managers
Scottish football managers
Greenock Morton F.C. managers
Hamilton Academical F.C. managers
Pezoporikos Larnaca managers
Scottish Football League representative players
Scottish Football League managers